Yuzuru "Jim" Kojima  (born 1938) is a Canadian judoka who has been deeply involved in the development of Canadian Judo, and was made a Member of the Order of Canada in 1983 and decorated with the Order of the Rising Sun, Gold Rays with Rosette in 2011 for his efforts. He has been the President of Judo Canada, Director of the International Judo Federation Referee Commmission, and was Chair of the 1993 World Judo Championships in Hamilton, Ontario.

Publications

Further reading

See also
Judo in British Columbia
Judo in Canada
List of Canadian judoka

References

Canadian male judoka
1938 births
Living people
20th-century Canadian people
21st-century Canadian people